Lorinda Panther (née O'Brynne; born 15 March 1963) is an association football player who represented New Zealand at international level.

Panther made her Football Ferns in a 0–0 draw with Australia on 28 November 1983, and finished her international career with 14 caps to her credit.

References

1963 births
Living people
New Zealand women's international footballers
New Zealand women's association footballers
Women's association footballers not categorized by position